Double Jeopardy is a 1999 American crime thriller film directed by Bruce Beresford and starring Ashley Judd, Tommy Lee Jones, Bruce Greenwood, and Gillian Barber. Released on September 24, the film received mixed reviews from critics and grossed $177 million. It was remade in Hindi as Jurm in 2005.

Plot
Nick and Libby Parsons are wealthy residents of Whidbey Island, Washington. Libby's friend Angela Green offers to look after their four-year-old son Matty so they can spend a romantic weekend sailing. Libby awakens to find blood everywhere and her husband missing. The Coast Guard arrive and find Libby holding a bloody knife.

Although Nick's body is not found, Libby is arrested, tried, and convicted of murder. Her motive is assumed to be a $2 million life insurance policy and her alleged knowledge that Nick was under investigation for embezzlement. Not wanting Matty to become a ward of the state, she asks Angela to adopt him while she is in prison. At first, Angela regularly brings Matty to visit his mother, but when the visits cease, Libby tracks Angela to San Francisco and calls her. During their conversation, Nick enters and Matty yells, "Daddy!" Libby realizes that Nick faked his death and framed her. After failing to get investigative help, a fellow inmate and former lawyer tells Libby to get paroled for good behavior by falsely claiming remorse for "killing" Nick. Once free, Libby can kill Nick with impunity due to the Double Jeopardy Clause in the Fifth Amendment to the United States Constitution.

After six years in prison, Libby is paroled to a halfway house under the supervision of parole officer Travis Lehman, a former law professor whose wife and daughter left him due to his alcoholism. To search for Nick, Libby violates curfew and is caught breaking into Matty's old school on Whidbey Island to get Angela's records. As Lehman takes Libby back to prison via a car ferry, he handcuffs her to his car's door handle. Libby manages to start the car and rams another car into the water, but when Lehman tries to stop her, she drives his car off the ferry. As it sinks, he uncuffs her; she grabs his gun and swims away. She visits her mother who gives her cash and her truck.

Libby uses Angela's Social Security number to learn her address in Colorado. There she hears from Angela's former neighbor that Angela, under a different name, died three years earlier in a natural gas explosion. A picture in the paper reveals a painting by Wassily Kandinsky owned by Nick, which Libby is able to trace to New Orleans through an art gallery. At the gallery, Lehman almost catches her, but she rams his car and destroys it before driving away. She flies to New Orleans and finds Nick running a small luxury hotel under the alias Jonathan Devereaux.

Libby confronts Nick during a fund-raising auction at his hotel and demands he return Matty in exchange for her walking away. Nick claims that he faked his death to avoid prison and provide her and Matty with the insurance money, not believing she would be convicted, and that Angie's death was an accident. Libby scoffs at his lies. During their conversation she sees Lehman arrive at the hotel and walks out. Lehman tells "Jonathan" that Libby believes he is her dead ex-husband and informs the local police that she is in the area.

The next day Libby arranges to meet Nick at Lafayette Cemetery No. 3 (filmed at Lafayette Cemetery No. 1) to take Matty. Nick hires a boy to lure Libby to a mausoleum, where Nick knocks Libby out and locks her in a coffin with a corpse. She shoots the hinges off the coffin lid with Lehman's gun, pushes it off, and escapes. Meanwhile, Lehman is in the office of "Jonathan" and notices the Kandinsky artwork that Libby was searching for in the gallery. Now unsure of Libby's guilt, he tells his boss in Washington State to fax him the driver's license for "Nicholas Parsons".

Lehman intercepts Libby and she breaks down sobbing. He then goes to Nick's hotel, where he reveals to Nick that he knows his true identity. After Lehman agrees to take a bribe of $100,000, Nick admits to "murdering" Libby. Libby emerges with Lehman's gun and both she and Lehman tell Nick that she can kill him with impunity because of the double jeopardy rule. However, instead of shooting Nick, she puts a bullet through the Kandinsky. Nick tells her where Matty is, Lehman reveals that he has recorded Nick's confession, and Nick pulls a gun, shooting Lehman in the shoulder. In the ensuing struggle, Nick is about to shoot Lehman again, but Libby recovers her gun and kills Nick. Lehman insists they go back to Washington to win her pardon. They later find Matty at a boarding school in Georgia, where he immediately recognizes his mother.

Cast
Ashley Judd as Elizabeth "Libby" Parsons
Tommy Lee Jones as Travis Lehman
Bruce Greenwood as Nicholas "Nick" Parsons/Simon Ryder/Jonathan Devereaux 
Annabeth Gish as Angie Green/Angie Ryder
Roma Maffia as Margaret Skolowski
Jay Brazeau as Bobby Long
Michael Gaston as Cutter
Daniel Lapaine as Handsome Internet Expert
Dave Hager as Jim Mangold
Benjamin Weir as Matty Parsons – age 4
Spencer Treat Clark as Matty Parsons – age 11
Davenia McFadden as Evelyn Lake
Betsy Brantley as Prosecutor
Babz Chula as Ruby

Production notes
After Michelle Pfeiffer, Meg Ryan and Brooke Shields all declined the role, Jodie Foster was attached to star in the film as Libby Parsons and Bruce Beresford met with her several times about the script:
She said to me once, when we were having... not an argument, we had different points of view over something, and she said, 'We'll have to do it my way, I'm afraid.' And I said, 'Why, Jodie?' And she said, 'Because I'm so intelligent. I'm such an intelligent person that there is no point in disagreeing with me because I'm always right.' I thought she was joking, but she wasn't! [laughs] She had this extraordinary opinion of her own IQ.

Reception
On Rotten Tomatoes the film holds an approval rating of 28% based on 87 reviews and an average rating of 4.5/10. The site's critics consensus reads: "A talented cast fails to save this unremarkable thriller." On Metacritic, it has a weighted average score of 40 out of 100 based on 30 critics, indicating "mixed or average reviews". Audiences polled by CinemaScore gave the film an average grade of "B+" on an A+ to F scale.

Roger Ebert gave the film two and a half stars out of four, and said "This movie was made primarily in the hopes that it would gross millions and millions of dollars, which probably explains most of the things that are wrong with it." Leonard Maltin gave the film 3 out of 4 stars, calling it "slick entertainment". Mick LaSalle from the San Francisco Chronicle wrote that the film is a "well-acted diversion, directed by Bruce Beresford (Driving Miss Daisy) with an intelligent grasp of the moment-to-moment emotion". For her performance in the film Ashley Judd won Favorite Actress at the 6th Blockbuster Entertainment Awards.

Accolades

Box office
The film spent three weeks as the No. 1 film.  It grossed $116 million in the US and $61 million overseas.

Misinterpretation of the concept of double jeopardy 

The film incorrectly implies that the Double Jeopardy Clause of the Fifth Amendment gives someone a free pass to commit a subsequent crime if they are wrongfully convicted. As the newspaper column The Straight Dope'' pointed out: "a crime, for double jeopardy purposes, consists of a specific set of facts. Change the facts and you've got a new crime [...] no one would believe that a person convicted of beating Richard Roe to a pulp on December 8th could avoid another conviction for tracking down poor Rich in February and whaling on him again." In the case of homicide, which cannot (naturally) be committed against the same person twice, it may give the impression that the first, wrongful conviction would preclude a factually correct second one; legally, this is not the case. The second prosecution could proceed in a retrial since the veracity of the original verdict is now undermined by known facts. However, murder is a state crime, so, in Libby's specific case, a prosecution of her for shooting Nick in the state of Louisiana would not be precluded by her conviction for stabbing him to death in Washington, the states being separate sovereigns.

References

External links

 
 Straight Dope article on Double Jeopardy, including discussion of this film
 

1999 films
1990s adventure films
1990s chase films
1999 crime thriller films
1990s legal films
1990s English-language films
American films about revenge
American adventure thriller films
American chase films
American crime thriller films
American legal films
Fictional portrayals of the New Orleans Police Department
Films about dysfunctional families
Films about miscarriage of justice
Films directed by Bruce Beresford
Films scored by Normand Corbeil
Films set in San Francisco
Films set in the San Francisco Bay Area
Films set in Washington (state)
Films shot in New Orleans
Films shot in Vancouver
Films shot in Washington (state)
Films with screenplays by Douglas S. Cook
Films with screenplays by David Weisberg
Legal thriller films
Paramount Pictures films
Women in prison films
1990s American films